Ramathaim-Zophim, also called Ramah and Ramatha in the Douay–Rheims Bible translation (Ramathaimsophim in the Vulgate), is a city from the Hebrew Bible, the home town and resting place of prophet Samuel. The name of the town means "the heights of the views."

Identification
Ramah, the home of Elkanah, Samuel's father, the birthplace of Samuel and the seat of his authority, the town is frequently mentioned in the history of that prophet and of David. Here Samuel died and was buried.

The historian Josephus distinguishes between Ramathaim, "a city of the tribe of Ephraim," and Ramah, the burial place of Samuel the prophet, but he does not explicitly say that these were two different places.

Ramathaim-Zophim has been tentatively identified with one of two sites. One of them is the modern Palestinian village of Nabi Samwil, the other the former village, now town, of er-Ram.

Er-Ram as Ramah
Ramah, according to Eusebius' Onomasticon, was located 6 milestones north of Jerusalem (Ailia), opposite Bethel. Accordingly, Ramah is now thought by many historical geographers to be Er Ram, about 8 km north of Jerusalem.

Nabi Samwil as Ramah
Nabi Samwil stands about 5 miles north-west of Jerusalem, and is held by an originally Christian tradition dating back to the Byzantine period to be the resting place of the prophet Samuel). The site comprises what is now the Israeli Nebi Samuel National Park, with its most prominent feature being a two-storey Crusader fortress, now used as a mosque and a Jewish Orthodox synagogue.

Benjamin of Tudela visited Nabi Samwil when he travelled the land in 1173, noting that the Crusaders had found the bones of Samuel in a Jewish cemetery in Ramla on the coastal plain and reburied them here, on the hill overlooking the Holy City. C. R. Conder, of the Palestine Exploration Fund, discredits this tradition.

Ramallah as Ramathaim-Zophim
C. R. Conder of the Palestine Exploration Fund raised the hypothesis that, because of its high elevation and how that it affords a good prospect of the surrounding region, Ramathaim-Zophim may have been Ramallah.

Nabi Samwil as Mizpah
The traditional tomb site of Samuel the prophet, which became known as Neby Samwil ("the prophet Samuel"), may have been Mizpah in Benjamin, where Samuel was appointed leader of the Israelites. Such was the view of Edward Robinson who visited the site in 1838, and who vehemently objected to identifying Neby Samwil with the Ramah of Samuel. Conder and Kitchener of the Palestine Exploration Fund described the site in their days as being "a small hamlet of mud hovels." 

Judas Machabeus, preparing for war with the Syrians, gathered his men at Mizpah, over against Jerusalem: for in Mizpah was a place of prayer heretofore in Israel.

Arimathea
Some, e.g. Petrus Comestor (ca. 1100-1179) in his Historia Scholastica, Cap. CLXXX: De sepultura Domini, have identified Ramathaim-Zophim as Arimathea of the New Testament.

References

External links
 Nebi Samuel Park, Israel Nature and Parks Authority

Hebrew Bible cities